Carlo Aldini (1894–1961) was an Italian actor and film producer.

Selected filmography

References

Bibliography
 Haining, Peter. Agatha Christie: Murder in four acts : a centenary celebration of 'The Queen of Crime' on stage, films, radio & TV. Virgin, 1990.

External links

1894 births
1961 deaths
Italian male film actors
Italian film producers
Actors from the Province of Lucca